Joshua is a 1976 American Western film directed by Larry G. Spangler.

The film is also known as Black Rider, Joshua the Black Rider or Revenge.

Plot
A black soldier returns from fighting for the Union in the Civil War only to find out that his mother has been murdered by a gang of white thugs. He becomes a bounty hunter, determined to track down and kill the men who killed his mother.

Cast
 Fred Williamson as Joshua
 Cal Bartlett as Jed
 Brenda Venus as Sam's Wife
 Isela Vega as Mexican Woman
 Bud Stout as Rex
 Henry Hendrick as Sam
 Ralph Willingham as Weasle
 Kathryn Jackson as Martha, Josh's Mom

Filming locations 
 Monument Valley, Utah
 La Sal National Forest
 Colorado River
 Arches National Park
 Valley of the Gods

Critical reception
According to film critic Ian Jane, "If you're a Williamson fan, you'll enjoy the film as he basically carries it and does a pretty decent job as the steely eyed man of few words. The film makes great use of its locations and is well photographed - the widescreen compositions are frequently impressive, and the movie zips along at a good pace, but it's not the most original western ever made in terms of story or character development. That said, there's enough action and intrigue here to keep most fans happy and, as mentioned, Williamson makes the most of his leading man status in this picture. Brenda Venus is also pretty captivating here, the camera loves her and you can't really blame it. She's alluring enough that you can certainly understand Sam's desire to get her back. If not a classic, Joshua is still a pretty worthwhile watch, particularly if you're a Williamson fan."

References

External links 
 
 
 

1976 films
1976 Western (genre) films
American Western (genre) films
American films about revenge
Films shot in Utah
African-American Western (genre) films
1970s English-language films
1970s American films